Muḥammad ‘Āshiq Ilāhī Bulandshahrī Muhājir Madanī (Muḥammad ‘Āshiq Ilāhī al-Baranī al-Madanī) was a prominent Indian Islamic scholar. He was a disciple of Muhammad Zakariyya Kandhlawi.

Biography
Ashiq Ilahi was born in Bulandshahr, United Provinces of British India in 1924 or 1925 (1343 AH).  He graduated from Mazahir Uloom in 1363 AH.

After completing his education, Ashiq Ilahi taught at various Indian madrasas and moved to Pakistan at the request of Muhammad Shafi Deobandi in 1384 AH. He taught tafsir and hadith for twelve years at the Darul Uloom Karachi. He later moved to Medina in 1396 AH  (1976 CE) where he died in 1422 AH (2002 CE). He was buried in al-Baqi'.

Literary works
His works include:
Tohfa-e-Khawateen.
Marne Ke Baad Kya Hōga?
Islami Adab.
Huququl Walidayn.
Anwar Ul Bayan (5 volume Urdu commentary of the Qur'an translated to English by Mufti Afzal Hoosen Elias).
Zadut Talibin (Translated to English by Abdur Rahman ibn Yusuf Mangera, he also wrote its commentary).
Al Fawa’idul Saniyya fi Sharhul Arba'een un Nawawiyya.
At Tashil ud Daruri fi Masa’ilul Quduri.

References

20th-century Muslim scholars of Islam
20th-century Indian Muslims
Deobandis
People from Bulandshahr
1920s births
2002 deaths
Mazahir Uloom alumni
Burials at Jannat al-Baqī